Lila Kari (née Sântean) is a Romanian and Canadian computer scientist, professor in the David R. Cheriton School of Computer Science at the University of Waterloo, Canada.

Biography
Professor Kari earned a master's degree at the University of Bucharest in 1987, studying there with Gheorghe Păun, and then moved to the University of Turku in Finland for her graduate studies, earning a Ph.D. in 1991 under the supervision of Arto Salomaa.  She came to the University of Western Ontario as a visiting professor in 1993, and by 1996 had been hired there as a tenure-track faculty member.  In 2017 she accepted a position of professor of computer science and University Research Chair at the University of Waterloo.

Research
Kari's thesis research was in formal language theory. In the mid-1990s, inspired by an article by Leonard Adleman in Science, she shifted her interests to DNA computing. In her research, together with Laura Landweber, she has initiated  and explored the study of computational power of DNA processing in ciliates, using her expertise to show that the DNA operations performed by genetic recombination in these organisms are Turing complete. Her more recent research has studied issues of nondeterminism and undecidability in self-assembly, as well as studies of  biodiversity informatics, such as proposing alignment-free methods  based on  Chaos Game Representation of DNA genomic sequences to identify and classify species.

Awards and honors
Kari won the Rolf Nevanlinna doctoral thesis award for the best Finnish mathematics doctoral thesis in 1991.

From 2002 to 2011, she held a Canada Research Chair in Biocomputing.

References

External links
Home page at University of Waterloo

Year of birth missing (living people)
Living people
Canadian computer scientists
Romanian emigrants to Canada
Canadian people of Romanian descent
Romanian computer scientists
Canadian women computer scientists
Romanian women computer scientists
University of Bucharest alumni
University of Turku alumni
Academic staff of the University of Western Ontario
Academic staff of the University of Waterloo
Canada Research Chairs
DNA nanotechnology people